Transmembrane protein 216 is a protein in humans that is encoded by the TMEM216 gene.

Clinical significance 

Mutations in this gene may be associated with Meckel syndrome or Joubert syndrome.

See also
 Ciliopathy

References

Further reading